Summer of Hate is the 2009 debut studio album by the San Diego band Crocodiles.  The New York Times featured the album in its Critics' Choice section, saying that Summer of Hate has "some catchy choruses and efficient low-fi landscapes."

The album cover is a photo of Manson Family member Ruth Anne Moorehouse.

Track listing
"Screaming Chrome" – 0:47
"I Wanna Kill - 4:35
"Soft Skull (In My Room)" – 2:32
"Here Comes the Sky" – 4:15
"Refuse Angels" – 2:43
"Flash of Light" – 5:05
"Sleeping With the Lord" – 3:18
"Summer of Hate" - 3:32
"Young Drugs" – 7:12

References 

2009 debut albums
Crocodiles (band) albums
Fat Possum Records albums